K15CU-D (channel 15) is a low-power television station licensed to Salinas, California, United States, broadcasting the digital multicast network Cozi TV to the Monterey Bay area. Owned and operated by the NBC Owned Television Stations group, it relays the second digital subchannel of KNTV from San Jose.

History
The station was put on air on February 16, 1990 (by Telemundo, then under separate ownership), as a translator of KSTS in San Francisco. The translator briefly had a local operation in Salinas, including a news bureau, which was closed in a cost-cutting move in 1992.

On February 8, 2010, the station went dark for technical reasons. The station returned to the air on March 11, 2010. On March 10, 2011, the license was canceled by mistake of the FCC. On April 8, NBC filed an Engineering STA and a Petition for Reconsideration to restore the station. The STA was granted on April 18, 2011. On May 8, the Petition for Reconsideration was granted and the license was reinstated.

On December 3, 2013, the FCC approved a request by NBCUniversal to convert the analog low-power station to digital, as a translator of KMUV-LP, the local Telemundo affiliate owned by the News-Press & Gazette Company.

In 2014, the station became a primary affiliate of Cozi TV, listed in FCC records as a translator of NBC owned-and-operated KNTV, which airs Cozi TV on a subchannel.

In October 2019, K15CU-D added TeleXitos as a second digital subchannel.

Subchannels
The station's signal is multiplexed:

References

External links
Cozi TV website

15CU-D
Low-power television stations in the United States
Cozi TV affiliates
TeleXitos affiliates
LX (TV network) affiliates
NBCUniversal television stations
Television channels and stations established in 1990
1990 establishments in California
Gabilan Range